The 2nd Force Support Battalion (2 FSB) is an Australian Army logistics battalion. Established in 1998, 2 FSB is a  reserve unit headquartered in Hobart, with depot in various locations across Tasmania and Victoria.

History
Formed on 1 August 1998 as a reserve unit, following the amalgamation of a number of supply, medical, military police, maintenance and transport units.  Its headquarters is at Derwent Barracks in Hobart, Tasmania, however it also has depots in Bendigo, Devonport, Horsham and Melbourne. While forming in Tasmania, in 2011, it took over three reserve sub-units from 9 FSB in Victoria. 

2 FSB is currently part of the 17th Sustainment Brigade. Its role is to provide third line or 'general' support within an area of operations.

Structure
As of 2020, 2 FSB is composed of the following sub-units:
Battalion Headquarters (Hobart)

6th Logistic Support Company (Hobart, Melbourne, Bendigo, Horsham & Devonport)
15th Force Support Squadron (Melbourne, Bendigo & Horsham)
44th Transport Squadron (Hobart & Devonport)

Previous sub-units
1st Petroleum Company
3rd Recovery Company
6th Supply Platoon
10th Health Company
15th Transport Squadron

Notes

References

Combat service support battalions of the Australian Army
Military units and formations established in 1998
Military units in Tasmania